Přepeře is a municipality and village in Semily District in the Liberec Region of the Czech Republic. It has about 1,000 inhabitants.

Sport
The local football club FK Přepeře plays in the Bohemian Football League (3rd tier of the Czech football league system).

Sights
The most valuable buildings are the Gothic Church of St. James the Great and a Neogothic parsonage.

References

Villages in Semily District